Lilian Vaughan Morgan (née Sampson; July 7, 1870 – December 6, 1952) was an American experimental biologist who made seminal contributions to the genetics of the fruit fly, Drosophila melanogaster. She was an important biologist, although her work was obscured by the attention given her husband, Nobel laureate Thomas Hunt Morgan. Lilian Morgan published sixteen single-author papers between 1894 and 1947. Probably her most significant scientific contribution was the discovery of the attached-X chromosome and an entirely new pattern of inheritance in Drosophila in 1921. Another important discovery was the closed or ring-X chromosome in 1933. Both are important research tools today.

Early life
Morgan was born in 1870 in Hallowell, Maine. She was orphaned at the age of three when her parents and younger sister died of tuberculosis. After the death of her parents, she and her older sister Edith were raised by her maternal grandparents in Germantown, Pennsylvania.

Early research career
Morgan enrolled as an undergraduate student at Bryn Mawr in 1887. She majored in biology and was advised by Martha Carey Thomas. After her graduation with honors in 1891, she spent the summer at the Marine Biological Laboratory in Woods Hole, Massachusetts, where Edmund Beecher Wilson, one of her previous zoology professors, introduced her to her future graduate advisor and husband, Thomas Hunt Morgan.

In the autumn of 1891, a European fellowship for the best graduate in class enabled Morgan to go to Europe and study the musculature of chitons at the University of Zurich with Arnold Lang, a comparative anatomist and student of Ernst Haeckel. She returned to Bryn Mawr in 1892, where she received her MS in biology in 1894, advised by Thomas Morgan. After graduation, she published her work on the musculature of chitons, returned to Woods Hole as an independent investigator, and spent seven summers investigating breeding, development and embryology in amphibia.

Family life
In 1904, at the age of 34, she married Thomas Hunt Morgan and moved to New York City, where he took a position at Columbia University. That following summer, they moved to California, where she researched and published work on planarian regeneration at the Stanford Marine Laboratory. She would not publish another paper for sixteen years. During this time, she supported her husband's career and raised four children: Howard Key Morgan, born 1906; Edith Sampson Morgan, born 1907; Lilian Vaughan Morgan, born 1910; and Isabella Merrick Morgan, born 1911. Shine and Wrobel (1976) note that one key to Thomas Hunt Morgan's success was that his personal affairs were entirely handled by Lilian Morgan, freeing him to focus on his research. The family spent their winters in New York and returned in the summers to Woods Hole, where she maintained a summer house for children, relatives and her husband's graduate students. She maintained this house for many years, eventually equipping it for science lessons for children.

Involvement in science education
With several other women, Morgan founded the Summer School Club at Woods Hole in 1913, which is now the Children's School of Science, and served as its first educational chairperson and Science Committee Chair in 1914. She preferred working outdoors with children to conduct experiments and discuss problems.

Later research career
After her children were old enough, Morgan returned to the laboratory to study Drosophila genetics. Her husband, T.H. Morgan, encouraged her but did not collaborate with her. Instead, he gave her working space in his laboratory, called the "Fly Room," at Columbia University, where she maintained her own Drosophila stocks but held no official position. Her husband and the other male scientists never became comfortable with her presence in the lab, whose atmosphere was "a little like that of an exclusive men's club." Morgan may also have felt isolated because she was older than the other women and was neither outgoing nor talkative, according to Alfred Sturtevant. Because she didn't hold an official position, she never attended a scientific meeting and never presented a paper at a conference.

Major research accomplishments

The attached-X chromosome
While working in the Fly Room at Columbia University, she spotted an unusual fruit fly. She captured it and mated it with a normal male. The results were the opposite of what was expected. She analyzed her data and discovered both an unusual chromosome and a new pattern of inheritance. This discovery became a powerful tool for X chromosome analysis. It provided further confirmation of the chromosome theory, sex determination, the linkage of traits on sex chromosomes, and an important tool for isolating and preserving traits on the X chromosome. After 100 years the attached-X strain continues to be used in genetics research and the new inheritance pattern, non-criss-cross inheritance, is taught in genetics courses and illustrated in genetics textbooks.

The ring-X chromosome
Another major contribution to the Drosophila genetic toolkit was the discovery of ring chromosomes. Ring chromosomes were discovered from their unusual frequencies of recombination in an attached-X stock, which revealed a circularized X-chromosome upon cytological examination. Ring-X chromosomes are unstable in early development, a phenomenon that has been applied to generate mosaic tissues containing XX and XO cells during mitosis that bear recessive loss-of-function alleles of specific X-linked genes.

Later life
Morgan and her family moved to California in 1928, where she continued her Drosophila research at the California Institute of Technology in Pasadena while her husband Thomas Hunt Morgan became the division head. Her husband died in 1945; one year afterwards, Morgan would receive her first official appointment of her life as a research associate at the age of 76. She died in 1952 at the age of 82 in Los Angeles.

Publications
Sampson, L. V. 1894. Die Muskulatur von Chiton. Jenaischen Zeitschrift für Naturwissenschaft 28: 460–468.
Sampson, L. V. 1895. The musculature of chiton. Journal of Morphology 11:595-628.
Sampson, L. V. 1900. Unusual modes of breeding and development among anura. Amer. Naturalist 34:687-715.
Sampson, L. V. 1904. A contribution to the embryology of Hylodes martinicensis. Araer. J. Anat. 3: 473–504.
Morgan, L. V. 1905. Incomplete anterior regeneration in the absence of the brain in Leploplana litloralis. Biol. Bull. 9:187-193.
Morgan, L. V. 1906. Regeneration of grafted pieces of planarians. J. Exp. Zool. 3:269-294.
Morgan, L. V. 1922. Non-criss-cross inheritance in Drosophila melanogaster. Biol. Bull. 42:267-274.
Morgan, L. V. 1925. Polyploidy in Drosophila melanogaster with two attached X chromosomes" Genetics 10:148-178.
Morgan, L. V. 1926. Correlation between shape and behavior of a chromosome" Proc. Natl. Acad. Sci 12:180-181.
Morgan, L. V. 1929. Composites of Drosophila melanogaster. Carnegie Inst. of Wash. Publ. No. 399: 225–296.
Morgan, L. V. 1931. Proof that bar changes to notbar by unequal crossing-over" Proc. Natl. Acad. Sci 17:270-272.
Morgan, L. V. 1933. A closed X chromosome in Drosophila melanogaster" Genetics 18:250-283.
Morgan, L. V. 1938a. Origin of attached-X chromosomes in Drosophila melanogaster and the occurrence of non-disjunction of X's in the male. Amer. Naturalist 72:434-446.
Morgan, L. V. 1938b. Effects of a compound duplication of the X chromosome of Drosophila melanogaster" Genetics 23:423-462.
Morgan, L. V. 1939. A spontaneous somatic exchange between non-homologous chromosomes in Drosophila melanogaster" Genetics 24:747-752.
Morgan, L. V. 1947. A variable phenotype associated with the fourth chromosome of Drosophila melanogaster and affected by heterochromatin" Genetics 32:200-219.
Morgan, T. H., H. Redfield, and L. V. Morgan. 1943. Maintenance of a Drosophila stock center, in connection with investigations on the germinal material in relation to heredity. Carnegie Inst. Wash. Yearbk. 42:171-174.
Morgan, T. H., A. H. Sturtevant, and L. V. Morgan. 1945. Maintenance of a Drosophila stock center, in connection with investigations on the germinal material in relation to heredity. Carnegie Inst. Wash. Yearbk. 44:157-160.

References

External links
 Children's School of Science in Woods Hole, MA.

1870 births
1952 deaths
Morgan, Lilian Vaughan
Bryn Mawr College alumni
Bryn Mawr College faculty
California Institute of Technology faculty
Columbia University faculty
People from Hallowell, Maine
Scientists from New York City
American women geneticists
19th-century American women scientists
20th-century American women scientists
American women academics